Donato Guerra is one of 125 municipalities in the State of Mexico, Mexico.  It's municipal seat is the town of Villa Donato Guerra, which is the 13th largest town in the municipality of Donato Guerra.  The area is also known as Malacatepec (meaning 'hill in the shape of a spindle) and  La Asunción Malacatepec. (Villa) Donato Guerra is located in the western part of the State of Mexico. In the region that is identified with Valle de Bravo. The town was named in 1880 in honor of Donato Guerra, a distinguished soldier of the War of La Reforma. It is located around 77 kilometers from Toluca which is the capital of the state, on Federal Highway number 35 Mexico City - Zitácuaro.

The town

Villa Donato Guerra lies at an altitude of 2,000 meters above sea level. The area was Mazahua territory until between 1474 and 1477 when it came under Mexica domination. It remain mostly populated by Mexicas until 1604. Franciscan friars constructed the Parish of Asuncion Malacatepec around 1550. As late as 1727, the town still had a commissioner of the Inquisition, naming lawyer Jose Bernal and Mendoza in that year. In 1770, a land and natural resources dispute arose between the towns of La Asunción Malacatepec and San Lucas Texcaltitlán, versus the owners of the haciendas of La Asunción, San Felipe Neri, Joloxtoc, and Endo. The town was formally recognized as an ayuntamiento in 1826 by the State of Mexico.

In the 2005 census, the village had only 921 people.

Villa Donato Guerra’s churches are St Martin Bishop, San Simon de la Laguna, San Francisco Mihualtepec, San Miguel Xooltepec and San Juan Xoconusco. The ruins of the Hacienda la Asuncion and Hacienda El Molino San Felipe Neri are examples of colonial constructions and are preserved as historical monuments.

The municipality
The municipality of Donato Guerra has governing jurisdiction over the following communities: Cabecera de Indígenas, Primer y Segundo Cuartel, San Martín, San Antonio Hidalgo, Batán Chico, Batán Grande, Mesas Altas de Xoconusco, El Capulín, Llano Redondo, Macheros, Barrio de Arriba, La Fundición, San José Tilostóc, Galeras, Ranchería de Santiago Huitlapaltepec, San Agustín de las Palmas, San Lucas Texcaltitlán, Santiago Huitlapaltepec, San Juan Xoconusco, San Martín Obispo, San Antonio de la Laguna, San Simón de la Laguna, San Francisco Mihualtepec, San Miguel Xooltepec.

History
In 1569, the region of Malacatepec, is recognized as separate from Almoloya de Juarez. On April 8, 1604, Marques de Montesclaros by mandate of Pedro de Campos, signs the agreement that divides to the region of Malacatepec in two congregations, Asuncion Malacatepec and San José.

On October 30, 1810, the Battle of Monte de las Cruces took place with what is now the current municipality, where the forces of General Miguel Hidalgo triumphed. A number of Mazahuas took part in this battle as well with distinction.

The current municipality is officially formed in 1870.

Natural geography
Donato Guerra is located in the region known as Sierra Mil Cumbres, with the peaks of this mountain area reaching 3,040 meters above sea level. At its southern border, begins tropical terrain.

45.29% of the territory is covered by forests. The main kinds of trees are pine, cedar, eucalyptus, ash, weeping willow, and oak. These trees can be used to obtain wood. Trees that give fruit are: avocado, chirimoya, walnut, plum, capulín, tejocote etc. There are also some plants that can be used for medicinal purposes such as: epazote, chamomile, yerba buena, wormwood, arnica, juniper, clover, papalo, pig weed, and fennel.

The main mammals that can be found are rabbits, coyotes, zool deers, zool hares, squirrels, rats, tlacuaches, cacomixtles, dogs, horses, cows, and pigs.

Avian life is constituted by huilotas, carpenter birds, owls, buzzards, falcons, orn ravens, and pigeons. Reptiles such as snakes (of various species), scorpions, iguanas and lizards are found as well.

Population
In 1950, Donato Guerra  had 10,514 inhabitants.  30 years later, in 1980, it had grown to only 13,671. However, the population census of 1990 registered 21,510 inhabitants. and in the last census in 2005 the total population for the municipality was 29,621. 74.05% live in rural areas and 25.95% live in urban areas.

Economy 
Since most people live in the rural areas, agriculture, both the raising of crops and livestock is the principal economic activity, with 9,016 hectares are devoted to the agricultural use. Principal livestock are cows, pigs, sheep, horses, hens, turkeys, beehives and rabbits. However, some industry exists in small factories, family workshops and craft cooperatives, clothes, shoes and bakeries.

Chronology of the municipal presidents 

Name	Period	Politic partid
 Wenceslao Sáenz	1913	
 Prospero María Yereno	1914-1916	
 Wilebaldo Gómez	1917	
 Pablo Reyes	1918	
 Dario Reyes Barcenas	1919	
 Antonio Usandizaga	1920	
 José María Cambrón PML	1920	
 Jorge Sánchez	1921	
 Alberto Usandizaga PML	1921	
 Jesús G. Avila	1922	
 Antonio Usandizaga	1923	
 Alberto Usandizaga	1924	
 Anastacio R. Mendieta	1925	
 José Félix Pliego	1926	
 Guillermo Mendieta	1927	
 Agustín Albarrán Fonseca	1928-1929	PNR
 Germán Reyes 1er. Regidor PML	1929	PNR
 Pedro Chamorro Mercado	1930-1931	PNR
 José García Argüello	1932-1933	PNR
 Agustín Albarrán Fonseca	1934-1935	PNR
 Armando Reyes J.	1936-1937	PNR
 Juan B. Bautista	1938-1939	PRM
 Jesús Mendieta 1er. Regidor PML	1939	PRM
 Manuel Reyes Muñoz	1940-1941	PRM
 José Mendieta Quintana	1942-1943	PRM
 José García Argüello	1944-1945	PRM
 Marcial Villegas Moreno	1946-1948	PRI
 Roberto Reyes Salguero PML	1948	PRI
 Jesús G. Avila	1949-1951	PRI
 Agustín Albarrán Fonseca	1952-1954	PRI
 Marcial Villegas Moreno (suplente)	1952-1954	PRI
 Lázaro Arriaga Escobar	1955-1957	PRI
 Agustín Albarrán Reyes	1958-1960	PRI
 Fidel Reyes Muñoz	1961-1963	PRI
 Roberto Reyes Salguero	1964-1966	PRI
 Agustín Albarrán Salguero	1967-1969	PRI
 Fernando Cuéllar Sánchez	1970-1972	PRI
 Arnulfo Villegas Jaramillo	1973-1975	PRI
 Santiago Avila Villegas	1976-1978	PRI
 Silvestre Torres Longares	1979-1981	PRI
 Prof. Elías Arzate Archunda	1982-1984	PRI
 Ing. Antelmo Mendieta Velázquez	1985-1987	PRI
 Arq. Héctor Jaime Sánchez García	1988-1990	PRI
 Germán Reyes García	1991-1993	PRI
 Ing. Lázaro Reyes González	1994-1996	PRI
 Arq. Jacobo Hernández Marín	1997-1998	PRI
 Prof. Ricardo Cruz Nieto PML	1998	PRI
 Prof. Mauro Noé Cuéllar Hernández 	1998-2000	PRI
 Anselmo Vega Chico	2000-2003	PRI
 Tomás Octaviano Félix	2003-2006	PRD
 Arturo Piña García	2006-2009	PRD

Ethnic groups
The Mazahuas were the first group to inhabit the region of Malacatepec. In communities such as San Martín Bishop, San Simón de la Laguna, San Antonio de la Laguna, San Francisco Mihualtepec, San Juan Soconusco, San Miguel Xooltepec and Santiago Huitlapaltepec, indigenous language, food, customs and ethnicity are still preserved. Approximately 10.224 people speak Mazahua.

Education
In Donato Guerra, there are 36 kindergartens, 38 elementary schools, 2 middle schools and 1 high school, and there are 284 teachers that attend these schools. However, there are 5,728 inhabitants that have not received any schooling, of which 1,613 are children and 4,115 are adults.

References

 
Populated places in the State of Mexico
1861 establishments in Mexico